MT MOL FSRU Challenger is a Bahamas-flagged liquefied natural gas (LNG) carrier, which is currently laid up in Singapore.

Characteristics
The vessel was built for the Japanese shipping company Mitsui O.S.K. Lines (MOL) at Okpo shipyard of Daewoo Shipbuilding & Marine Engineering in South Korea. She was named MOL FSRU Challenger at a ceremony held at the shipyard on 28 September 2017. The regasification capacity is 800 million standard cubic feet per day. She features LNG re-shipment and gas transfer capabilities. She is able to re-export LNG and supply the neighboring regions around her with LNG.

She was delivered to her owner, the Mitsui O.S.K. Lines (MOL) LNG Transport (Europe) Ltd. on 10 October 2017. She sails under the flag of The Bahamas with home port Nassau.

Charter operations
In 2016, before the delivery of the vessel, the Gas Sayago Company in Uruguay signed a formal agreement to charter the FSRU. However, due to delays, the deal was terminated without realization.

Turkey
BOTAŞ, the Turkish state-owned company for crude oil and natural gas pipelines, chartered the vessel under a short-term contract to be used as an offshore storage terminal. She sailed to eastern Mediterranean Sea arriving at Dörtyol, Hatay Province in November the same year. On 7 February 2018, she went in operation at the Botaş Dörtyol LNG Storage Facility. She is the second FSRU after MT GDF Suez Neptune, which serves at Egegaz Aliağa LNG Storage Facility in western Turkey.

Hong Kong
The ship owner announced in June 2018 that the vessel will go into service at the Hong Kong Offshore LNG Terminal to supply Hong Kong, the Black Point Power Station located at New Territories and Lamma Power Station at Lamma Island with natural gas after the completion of the facility by the end of 2020.

References

 

LNG tankers
Floating liquefied natural gas terminals
2017 ships
Ships built by Daewoo Shipbuilding & Marine Engineering
Tankers of Japan
Merchant ships of Japan
Energy infrastructure in Turkey
Natural gas in Turkey